Ulrich Horstmann (born 31 May 1949 in Bünde) is a German literary scholar and writer, who has also written under the pseudonym Klaus Steintal.

Life
Ulrich Horstmann finished his studies of English and Philosophy in 1974 with a doctoral thesis on Edgar Allan Poe. He was a lecturer at the University of South Africa in Pretoria. After habilitation in 1983 he lectured at the University of Münster until 1987. Since 1991 he has been a professor of English and American literature at the University of Giessen. He lives in Marburg.

Since 1976 Ulrich Horstmann has published, alongside scientific work, essays, novels and plays of his own, as well as translations from English. In 1983 he became known for his treatise The Beast, in which he promoted a philosophical position which was diametrically opposed to the peace movement Zeitgeist of those years: He advocated a philosophy of "escape of mankind" which aims for an early self-destruction of the human race by means of the accumulated nuclear weapons found in arsenals around the world. He pushed the pessimism and misanthropy of his intellectual forebear Schopenhauer to the extreme. It has been proved by the author's subsequent publications which are written with an attitude of nihilism and extreme distaste for the world, that The Beast was in no way, as suspected by some critics, a particularly bitter satire.

Ulrich Horstmann is a member of PEN Germany and received the Kleist Prize in 1988 after being nominated by Günter Kunert.

Thought
Horstmann puts forth the theory that mankind has been pre-programmed to eliminate itself in the course of history—and also all its memory of itself—through war (thermonuclear, genetic, biological), genocide, destruction of its sustaining environment, etc. “The final aim of history is a crumbling field of ruins. Its final meaning is the sand blown through the eye-holes of human skulls.” Through his analysis of history, he has concluded that our species is engaged in a constant process of armament, with the eventual end goal of wiping itself out through war. History, for him, is nothing more than a slaughterhouse . . . “the place of a skull and charnel house of a mad, incurably bloodthirsty slaughtering, flaying and whetting, of an irresistible urge to destroy to the last.”
Although inspired by the already extreme philosophy of Philipp Mainländer, Horstmann ends up with an even more explicit solution regarding the problem of human existence. In his book The Beast he actually goes so far as to suggest the use of nuclear weapons in order to bring forth the extinction of the human race.
For him only the annihilation of life would give rise to a universal redemption in which we would once again achieve the existential peace of inorganic matter. According to Horstmann’s apocalyptic vision:
The true Garden of Eden is desolation

Works
 Ansätze zu einer technomorphen Theorie der Dichtung bei Edgar Allan Poe, Bern 1975.  (Approaches to a technomorph theory of Edgar Allan Poe's poetry)
 Er starb aus freiem Entschluß- Ein Schriftwechsel mit Nekropolis, Obertshausen 1976 (under the name Klaus Steintal) (He died from a free decision - a correspondence with necropolis)
 Wordcadavericon, oder small thermonuclear Versschule for anybody, Cologne 1977.  (Wordcadavericon or small thermonuclear verse school for everyone)
 Nachgedichte Miniaturen aus der Menschenleere, Essen 1980 (After poems, Miniatures from the human emptiness)
 Steintals Vandalenpark Erzählung. Siegen 1981.  (Steintal's vandal park. Narrative)
 Terrarium oder Einführung in die Menschenhaltung . Munich 1981 (Terrarium or introduction into the keeping of  humans. Stage manuscript)
 Ästhetizismus und Dekadenz. Zum Paradigmakonflikt in der englischen Literaturtheorie des späten 19. Jahrhunderts.  Munich 1983.  (Aestheticism and decadence. About paradigm conflict in the English theory of literature of the late 19th century)
 Parakritik und Dekonstruktion . Paradise criticism and deconstruction. An introduction to the American post. Würzburg 1983. 
 The Beast (Das Untier). Contours of a philosophy of human flight. Vienna [including] 1983.  (reprint Warendorf 2004. )
 Brain Stroke (Hirnschlag), Aphorisms, Abtestate, Berserkasmen. Göttingen 1984. 
 Silo, A lesson in brood care. (Stage manuscript) Göttingen 1984
 The Donor (Der Spender), A comedy for Empfängnisbereite. (Stage manuscript) Munich 1984
 The Fortunes of OmB'assa, fantastic novel (Das Glück von OmB'assa, Phantastischer Roman), Frankfurt am Main 1985. 
 The Long Shadow of Melancholy (Der lange Schatten der Melancholie), Essay on a angeschwärztes feeling. Essen 1985. 
 Ufo oder Der dritte Stand . Eine leicht versandete Komödie. UFO, or the third. Comedy A slightly silted. (Stage manuscript) Munich 1987
 Schwedentrunk . Sweden draft. Gedichte. Poems. Frankfurt am Main 1989. 
 Patzer . Patzer. Roman. Zurich 1990. 
 Ansichten vom großen Umsonst . Views from large Zilch. Essays. Gütersloh 1991. 
 Ich kaufe ein Gedankenlos . I buy a Gedankenlos. Aphorismen. Aphorisms. Hamburg 1993
 Infernodrom . Infernodrom. Programm-Mitschnitte aus dreizehn Jahren. Programm-Mitschnitte thirteen years. Paderborn 1994. 
 Altstadt mit Skins . Old Town with skins. Gedichte. Poems. Paderborn 1995. 
 Conservatory (Konservatorium), Stories about short or long. Paderborn 1995. 
 Summon Shadow Realm (Beschwörung Schattenreich), Collected plays and radio plays 1978 until 1990, with an essay about the art, to go to hell. Paderborn 1996. 
 Gateway (Einfallstor), New aphorisms. Oldenburg 1998. 
 Jeffers-Meditationen oder Die Poesie als Abwendungskunst . Jeffers-Meditationen or averting The poetry as art. Heidelberg 1998. 
 Abdrift . Drift. Neue Essays. New essays. Oldenburg 2000. 
 Göttinnen, leicht verderblich . Goddesses, easily perishable. Gedichte. Poems. Oldenburg 2000. 
 J . Ein Halbweltroman. J. A half-Roman World. Oldenburg 2002. 
 Ausgewiesene Experten . Expelled experts. Kunstfeindschaft in der Literaturtheorie des 20. Art hostility in the literary theory of 20th Jahrhunderts. Century. Frankfurt am Main [including] 2003. 
 Picknick am Schlagfluß . Picnic on strike river. Poems. Oldenburg, 2005.

As editor
 Philipp Mainländer: Philosophie der Erlösung, Frankfurt am Main 1989.  
 Kunstgriffe. Auskünfte zur Reichweite von Literaturtheorie und Literaturkritik. Festschrift für Herbert Mainusch. Frankfurt am Main [u.a.] 1990.   
 Jack London: Der Ruf der Wildnis, München [u.a.] 1991.   
 Die stillen Brüter. Ein Melancholie-Lesebuch. Hamburg 1992.  
 English aphorisms, Stuttgart 1993.  
 Oscar Wilde: „Mein Name ist Prinz Paradox“, Stuttgart 2000.   
 Oscar Wilde: Oscar Wilde for pleasure, Stuttgart 2002.  
 Philipp Mainländer: Vom Verwesen der Welt und anderen Restposten, Warendorf 2003.

Translations
 Robert Burton: Anatomie der Melancholie, Zürich [u.a.] 1988.  (Neue Ausgabe in Die Andere Bibliothek Nr. 228, Frankfurt am Main 2003.  ) 
 Greg Cullen: Heldengedenken. Ein Falkland-Requiem. (Bühnenmanuskript) München 1987
 Ted Hughes: Gedichte, Heidelberg 1995.  
 Philip Larkin: Hier, (Privatdruck) Marburg 2002
 Jack London: Der Seewolf, München 1990.  
 Jonathan Swift: Ein Tonnenmärchen, Stuttgart 1994.  
 James Thomson: Nachtstadt und andere lichtscheue Schriften, Zürich 1992.

Literature
 Burkhard Biella: Zur Kritik des anthropofugalen Denkens, Essen 1986.  
 Rajan Autze / Frank Müller: Steintal-Geschichten. Auskünfte zu Ulrich Horstmann. Oldenburg 2000.

References

External links
 Synopsis of "The Beast. Outlines of a Philosophy of Fleeing Mankind"
 http://www.untier.de/
 http://www.uni-giessen.de/~ga46/
 http://www.wlb-unna.de/ 
 Interview with Horstmann (in German)
 Ulrich Horstmann in: NRW Literatur im Netz 

1949 births
Living people
20th-century German male writers
21st-century German male writers
Anti-natalists
German male non-fiction writers
Kleist Prize winners
Philosophical pessimists
Academic staff of the University of Giessen
Academic staff of the University of Münster
People from Herford (district)
Pseudonymous writers